Bruce Jurgens (born July 11, 1965 in San Diego, California, United States) is a visual effects supervisor. Other work by Jurgens includes X-Men.

Credits

 Dracula Untold (2014)
 Niech żyje pogrzeb (2008)
 Katyń (2007)
 We're All Christs (2006)

 Click (2006)
 Cursed (2005)
 Mindhunters (2004)
 Final Fantasy: The Spirits Within (2001)
 Open Season (2006)
 Monster House (2006)
 Stealth (2005)
 The Day After Tomorrow (2004)
 Hellboy (2004)

References

External links
 
 TVP Interview with Bruce Jurgens & kino Scialabba (in Polish)
  EMERALD Group

1965 births
Living people
American University alumni
George Washington University Corcoran School alumni